David "Jim" Penman is an Australian businessman and historian in the field of biohistory. He is the owner of Jim's Group, a lawn care service franchise. He has self-published books, based partially on his work with a lab he funds at La Trobe University, to make claims on predicting human culture and history based on the activities of mice. His books have been described as eugenics, drawing on racial stereotypes. Penman described his ideas as being classified as conservative liberalism  and neoliberalism.

Early life
Penman's father, Tom Penman, worked in different roles, including academic with the University of Adelaide and Chief Engineer at Carlton United Breweries. His mother, Margaret Moxham, was a teacher from Scone, NSW, who met Tom at a Youth Hostel in Wales, whilst she was holidaying in the United Kingdom. The family emigrated to Australia in 1955 and eventually there were four children in the family: Lynne, David (Jim), Chris and Gill.

Education
Penman attended Prince Alfred College in Adelaide, Sydney Church of England Grammar School and Melbourne Grammar, followed by an Honours Degree in sociology at La Trobe University. In 1974, Penman commenced PhD degree studies at La Trobe University, under the supervision of June Philipp, who was part of a network of ethnographic historians called "the Melbourne Group" The PhD thesis looked at character as a key to understanding history. Penman's thesis was initially rejected in 1981, although Penman's supervisor then suggested that he rewrite the methodology section of the thesis. Penman followed the suggestion, and the thesis was re-submitted in 1983 and subsequently accepted in April 1984, under the title 'Personality and Culture'. At the time, the thesis did not attract any scholarly attention.

Jim's Group 
After the completion of his PhD in 1983, Penman gradually turned his part-time lawn mowing business into a franchising business, focussing on setting up and selling lawn-mowing rounds and taking on sub-contractors, rather than simply mowing lawns. Between 1983 and 1989, he sold around 100 rounds.

In 1988 VIP Home Services came into the market in Victoria, which prompted Penman to systemise his own processes and create the Jim's Mowing franchise. Penman states that his mandate is to be fanatical about service to both franchisees and customers. However, he has a reputation for becoming angry quickly and for "being a firer", with a high turnover at the Jim's Group national office. After firing his sister, the two have been estranged.

After launching the franchise business in 1989, Penman expanded to include additional industries. The first addition was cleaning services, and by 2012 the franchise model had been adapted to over 30 service industries. However, Penman's business model was also criticised in 2012 for being inappropriate for managing the large number of franchisees.

During the COVID-19 pandemic in 2020, Penman was a critic of how Victoria's lockdown rules were applied to his franchisees, including encouraging them to continue work despite lockdown restrictions. In August he discussed the possibility of legal action against the Victorian government, and in October it was announced that about 700 Jim's Mowing franchisees were joining a class action led by Carbone Lawyers.

Research interests 
In the 2006, Penman began funding his own research projects to further the ideas he laid out in his PhD thesis. The initial $500,000 in 2006 had grown to approximately a million per year by 2017 according to Penman, with him aiming to increase that to 3 million per year. The intended application of the research being to halt his predicted economic and moral decline of the West, with subsequent takeover by China and then a unified Africa.

In 2015, Penman self-published the books Biohistory and Biohistory: The Decline and Fall of the West about epigenetics based on his PhD thesis. His works have been critiqued as drawing "heavily on racial stereotypes" and having a nationalist and eugenicist agenda. Though this work has not garnered much mainstream impact, it has been noted by critics that the praise it has received comes from racist and white-supremacist journals such as The Occidental Quarterly and Mankind Quarterly.

Penman stated that after his PhD thesis was rejected, he could not get an academic post and had to self-fund his research interests. However, in 2006 he began funding research at La Trobe University's School of Psychological Science under Tony Paolini based on the theories in his books. His primary researach collaborator, Paolini, said "I think, basically, Jim has a lot of ideas and I, as a scientist, help to funnel those ideas into testable hypotheses". As part of this work with La Trobe, Penman has co-authored some articles on calorie restriction in rats. In 2017, he also founded the Institute for Social Neuroscience (ISN) Psychology, a private research institute and tertiary education provider where, Penman was the sole member of the Board of Directors and a member of the Academic Board along with Paolini.

His intended future research includes the behavioral and physiological benefits of mild food shortage (without restricting food) on adverse epigenetic effects of early environment and a drug to make people more focussed, more hard working, more intelligent and creative, and using CRISPR to make genetic and epigenetic changes.

Personal life 
Penman has been married four times and has 11 children. He was an atheist up to his conversion to Christianity in 1979 and he describes himself as an evangelical Christian. He attends a conservative creationist church, although he himself is an evolutionist.

Books 

Jim's Mowing and franchise development:
J. Penman (1992) The Cutting Edge: Jim's Mowing, a Franchise Story  
J. Penman (1998) Surprised by Success: The Very Australian Story of Jim's Mowing  
J. Penman (2003) What Will They Franchise Next?: The Story of Jim's Group 
J. Penman (2013) Selling by Not Selling: From $24 to a Turnover of $24 Million 

Epigenetics, culture and society:
Jim Penman (1992) The Hungry Ape: Biology And The Fall Of Civilisations 
J. Penman (2015) Biohistory: Decline and Fall of the West, Cambridge Scholars 
J. Penman (2015) Biohistory, Cambridge Scholars

References 

1952 births
Living people
People from Stourbridge
La Trobe University alumni
Australian businesspeople
Australian company founders
Australian non-fiction writers